The 2012 World Rowing Championships were World Rowing Championships that were held from 15 to 19 August 2012 at Plovdiv, Bulgaria. The annual week-long rowing regatta is organized by FISA (the International Rowing Federation), and held at the end of the northern hemisphere summer. Because the 2012 Summer Olympics was the major rowing event in 2012, the programme was limited to non-Olympic events, and the World Rowing Junior Championships were held at the same time.

Medal summary

Men's events

Women's events

Event codes

Medal table

References

External links
 Official results, WorldRowing.com

World Rowing Championships
World Rowing Championships 2012
World Rowing Championships
Rowing World Championships 2012
2012 in Bulgarian sport
Sport in Plovdiv
Rowing